Cowles Media Company  (1935–1998) was a newspaper, magazine and information publishing company based in Minneapolis, Minnesota in the United States. The company operated Cowles Business Media, Cowles Creative Publishing, and Cowles Enthusiast Media units. 

Owners of the Minneapolis Star-Tribune from 1935 to 1998, other newspapers owned at one time by Cowles Media and its affiliates included the Des Moines Register,  the Buffalo Courier-Express, the Scottsdale Progress and the Rapid City Journal. The company also owned the Register and Tribune Syndicate (established in 1922).

History 
The Cowles Media Company was formed in 1935 when the Cowles family purchased the Minneapolis Star — the family and its patriarch Gardner Cowles Sr. previously owned the Des Moines Register. At that point Gardner Cowles Sr. handed control of the family's media business to his sons John Cowles Sr. and Gardner "Mike" Cowles Jr. In 1939, the company purchased the Star main competitor, the Minneapolis Evening Journal, merging them  into the Star-Journal. The following year, the company bought the Minneapolis Tribune, giving it ownership of the major newspapers on the western side of the Twin Cities. The Tribune became Minneapolis' morning newspaper, the Star-Journal (shortened to the Star in 1947) was the evening newspaper, and they published a joint Sunday edition. A separate evening newspaper (the Times) was spun off, which published until 1948.

They published Harper's Magazine from 1965 to 1980.

In 1955, Cowles entered television as majority owner of what is now KCCI in Des Moines, Iowa. Cowles became the station's sole owner shortly after its launch. Over the years, Cowles acquired several television stations in medium-sized markets. These stations were sold off by the mid-1980s.

In 1986, Cowles sold the Register and Tribune Syndicate to Hearst Communications for $4.3 million.

The McClatchy Company purchased Cowles Media in 1998. McClatchy kept the Star Tribune newspaper, which by then was the primary asset in the $1.4 billion deal, and sold the other business units to Primedia and to a management team.

 Cowles Media's leader was John Cowles Jr. Look magazine (1937-1971) was published by an unrelated company known as Look, Inc. (1937–1945), Cowles Magazines (1946–1965), and Cowles Communications, Inc. (1965–1971), run by Gardner Cowles Jr., John Jr.'s uncle. From 1969 to 1971 Cowles Communications sold Family Circle and other publications, retaining five broadcasting stations, a travel magazine, and a marketing service.

Newspapers owned by the Cowles Media Company

List of specialty magazines

Healthy lifestyles 
 Climbing magazine
 Country Journal
 Low-Fat & Fast
 Natural Remedies
 Vegetarian Times

Collectibles 
 Doll Reader
 Figurines & Collectibles
 Nautical World (formerly Nautical Collector)
 Teddy Bear and Friends

History magazines 
Eight of the history magazines subsequently published by Weider History Group starting around 2006.

 America's Civil War
 American History
 Aviation History
 British Heritage
 Civil War Times Illustrated
 Columbiad
 Early American Homes (formerly Early American Life)
 Historic Traveler
 MHQ: The Quarterly Journal of Military History
 Military History
 Vietnam Magazine
 Wild West
 Women's History (annual)
 World War II

Hunting 
 Bowhunter
 Fly Fisherman

Recreation 
 Dressage & CT
 Horse & Rider
 KITPLANES
 Practical Horseman
 Southwest Art

Television stations owned by the Cowles Media Company 

Notes:
1 Cowles also owned KHON-TV's satellite in Wailuku, KAII-TV. Another KHON-TV satellite, KHAW-TV in Hilo, was owned by a third party but leased to Cowles. The Hawaii stations were NBC affiliates under Cowles. 
2 Cowles owned a majority share of this station when it first signed on and became its sole owner shortly thereafter.

Gallery

See also
Cowles Company
King Features Syndicate
Office of War Information
Primedia
Simba Information
The Des Moines Register

External links 
 Cowles Family Archive at Cowles Library, Drake University

Notes

Defunct broadcasting companies of the United States